North Wollongong railway station is located on the South Coast railway line in New South Wales, Australia. It serves the Northern Wollongong suburb of North Wollongong, opening on 19 July 1915. It is the primary station for the University of Wollongong.

Platforms and services
North Wollongong has two side platforms serviced by NSW TrainLink South Coast line services travelling between Sydney Central, Bondi Junction and Kiama, as well as local services from Waterfall and Thirroul to Port Kembla.

Transport links
Busabout operates one route via North Wollongong station:
887: Campbelltown station to Wollongong station via Appin & Bulli Pass

Dion's Bus Service operates three routes via North Wollongong station:
9: Shuttle to University of Wollongong Ring Road
90: Austinmer station to Wollongong
92: Bulli station to Wollongong via East Woonona

Premier Charters operates one route via North Wollongong station:
2: Stanwell Park to Wollongong

Premier Illawarra operates seven routes via North Wollongong station:
3: Wollongong to Balgownie via Towradgi, Bellambi Point & Corrimal anti-clockwise loop
6: Wollongong to University of Wollongong via Mount Pleasant
7: Wollongong to Cabbage Tree Lane via Bellambi, Corrimal & Balgownie
8: Wollongong to Towradgi via Balgownie, Corrimal & Bellambi clockwise loop
10: Wollongong to Keiraville via Gwynneville
55A: Wollongong Shuttle anti-clockwise loop (weekends only)
55C: Wollongong Shuttle clockwise loop (weekends only)

References

External links

North Wollongong station details Transport for New South Wales

Buildings and structures in Wollongong
Easy Access railway stations in New South Wales
Railway stations in Australia opened in 1915
Regional railway stations in New South Wales
University of Wollongong
Transport in Wollongong
North Wollongong, New South Wales